Plectrohyla lacertosa is a species of frog in the family Hylidae.
It is endemic to Mexico.
Its natural habitats are subtropical or tropical moist montane forests and rivers.
It is threatened by habitat loss.

References

Plectrohyla
Amphibians described in 1954
Taxonomy articles created by Polbot